Patrick Konrad (born 13 October 1991) is an Austrian racing cyclist, who currently rides for UCI WorldTeam .

Career
He joined  for the 2015 season, and he was named in the start list for the 2016 Tour de France and the start list for the 2017 Giro d'Italia. In 2018 he won the mountains classification at the Tour de Pologne, and finished seventh overall at the Giro d'Italia. In 2019 he won the Austrian National Road Race Championships and placed 3rd in the Tour de Suisse. In the 2020 Giro d'Italia, held in October instead of May due to the COVID-19 pandemic in Italy, he finished in eighth place overall.

In 2021, Konrad won his first stage at a Grand Tour, winning a hilly stage 16 of the Tour de France; he also won the stage's combativity award. As a result, he became the third Austrian rider to win a stage at the Tour de France, after Max Bulla in 1931 and Georg Totschnig in 2005.

Personal life
He is the son of the organiser of the Vienna City Marathon and former middle-distance runner Wolfgang Konrad.

Major results

2009
 3rd Overall Oberösterreich Juniorenradrundfahrt
1st Stage 2
 4th Time trial, National Junior Road Championships
2011
 4th Road race, National Road Championships
 4th Tobago Cycling Classic
2012
 5th Eschborn-Frankfurt City Loop U23
 7th Overall Toscana-Terra di Ciclismo
 9th Overall Tour de l'Avenir
2013
 3rd Overall Tour de l'Avenir
 5th Grand Prix Südkärnten
 7th Overall Course de la Paix U23
 10th Road race, UCI Under-23 Road World Championships
 10th Puchar Uzdrowisk Karpackich
2014
 1st  Overall Oberösterreich Rundfahrt
1st  Austrian rider classification
 2nd Raiffeisen Grand Prix
 4th Overall Tour of Austria
1st  Young rider classification
 4th Overall Le Triptyque des Monts et Châteaux
1st Stage 2b
 4th Grand Prix Südkärnten
 6th Overall Rhône-Alpes Isère Tour
1st  Combativity classification
 10th Croatia–Slovenia
2015
 1st Stage 1 (TTT) Giro del Trentino
 5th Overall Danmark Rundt
 9th Overall Tour de l'Ain
 10th Overall Tour of Oman
 10th Overall Abu Dhabi Tour
2016
 5th Overall Giro del Trentino
 6th Rudi Altig Race
2017
 3rd Vuelta a Murcia
 7th Overall Tour of the Basque Country
 10th Overall Abu Dhabi Tour
1st  Sprints classification
2018
 1st  Mountains classification, Tour de Pologne
 5th Grand Prix Cycliste de Québec
 6th Trofeo Serra de Tramuntana
 7th Overall Giro d'Italia
 7th Overall Paris–Nice
 9th Grand Prix Cycliste de Montréal
 10th Overall Tour of the Basque Country
 10th La Flèche Wallonne
2019
 National Road Championships
1st  Road race
3rd Time trial
 3rd Overall Tour de Suisse
 4th Overall Vuelta a Murcia
 6th Clásica de San Sebastián
 7th La Flèche Wallonne
 7th Trofeo Campos, Porreres, Felanitx, Ses Salines
 9th Overall Tour of the Basque Country
2020
 2nd Overall Sibiu Cycling Tour
 7th La Flèche Wallonne
 8th Overall Giro d'Italia
2021
 1st  Road race, National Road Championships
 Tour de France
1st Stage 16
 Combativity award Stage 16
 5th Overall Tour de la Provence
 7th Grand Prix de Wallonie
2022
 4th Road race, National Road Championships
 5th BEMER Cyclassics
 8th Overall Tour de Hongrie
2023
 7th Trofeo Andratx–Mirador D'es Colomer
 10th Trofeo Ses Salines–Alcúdia

General classification results timeline

References

External links

 Profile at netapp-endura.com
 

1991 births
Living people
Austrian male cyclists
People from Mödling
Sportspeople from Lower Austria
Austrian Tour de France stage winners
Olympic cyclists of Austria
Cyclists at the 2020 Summer Olympics